Zhou Fu (also romanised as Chow Fuh; (道光十七年十一月二十三日 in Chinese calendar) December 20, 1837 – (九月二十一 in Chinese calendar) October 21, 1921) was a Han Chinese official of the Qing dynasty. He was Viceroy of Liangjiang in 1904–1906 and Viceroy of Liangguang in 1906–1907.

He began his career as an army secretary at Li Hongzhang's camp in Anqing, Anhui province during the Taiping Rebellion, who served Li the longest, from 1860 to Li's death in 1901. In 1902 he became governor of Shantung Province. The New York Times described him as "able and progressive" and noted his "pro-foreign views".

References

1837 births
1921 deaths
Political office-holders in Guangdong
Qing dynasty politicians from Anhui
Political office-holders in Shandong
Assistant Grand Secretaries
Viceroys of Liangguang
Viceroys of Liangjiang
Politicians from Chizhou
Viceroys of Min-Zhe
Viceroys of Zhili